SQMS may refer to:
Squadron Quartermaster Sergeant, a staff sergeant appointment in traditionally mounted regiments and corps of the British Army
Staff Quartermaster Sergeant, a warrant officer class 2 appointment in the Royal Army Service Corps, Royal Corps of Transport and Royal Logistic Corps